Trans Lifeline is a peer support and crisis hotline 501(c)(3) non-profit organization serving transgender people by offering phone support and microgrants. It is the first transgender crisis hotline to exist in the United States as well as Canada. It is also the only suicide hotline whose operators are all transgender (binary or non-binary). As of 2019, the organization was host to approximately 95 volunteers in addition to a small paid staff. The US number is (877) 565-8860. The Canada number is (877) 330-6366.

Background
Trans Lifeline was founded in 2014 to address the epidemic of suicidality and lack of national resources for the trans community. It was founded by Nina Chaubal and Greta Gustava Martela, two San Francisco software engineers.

In November 2016, in response to a Tumblr post accusing Trans Lifeline's founders of embezzlement and harassment, the organization published an article on their Medium page denying the allegations of embezzlement and explaining their decision to directly confront individuals who they believe facilitate transphobia. However, Chaubal and Martela were dismissed by the organization's board of directors in 2018 after an internal review found they had diverted $353,703 to unapproved personal purchases and side projects. Chaubal and Martela were able to repay $8,585, and in June 2018, agreed to mediation with Trans Lifeline in which they would repay the remaining amount over the next ten years, in lieu of lawsuit or other recovery.

In 2017, the organization merged with Trans Assistance Project in order to address a component of the trans narrative that is often missing, that of socioeconomic justice. The merger became the organization's microgrants program, which gifts small grants to trans people who are in need of funds to cover the fees associated with legal name changes. The organization's guiding ethos is "justice-oriented collective community aid," a concept the organization promotes based on the belief that both economic justice and having affirming trans community are part of and key to trans liberation. As of 2019, the microgrants program had dispersed a total of $375,000. Approximately 1,000 people were served, with each grant being approximately $360. As of June 1, 2020, 75% of microgrants made each cycle go to transgender people of color. At least 20 microgrants each month go to youth ages 18–29.

The organization’s hotline does not engage in non-consensual active rescue, meaning operators never call 911, police, or emergency services on callers without an expressed request and consent, based on research associating involuntary hospitalization with increases suicide attempts after discharge. Additionally, they believe that calling the police on transgender people in crisis, particularly trans people of color, causes more harm.

The organization also oversees a program the Inside Advocacy project to support incarcerated trans people. The project provides funds for trans people's commissaries so that they may afford "basic comforts" while imprisoned. The program also works to provide microgrants to trans people in ICE detention.

As of June 2020, the organization had set in motion a Spanish language extension in order to serve Spanish-speakers calling the hotline. This involved recruiting multilingual volunteer staff to answer calls. The new service serving the Spanish speaking community went into effect on July 1, 2020.

Budget
In a June 2019 interview on the podcast Queery, Trans Lifeline Executive Director Elena Rose Vera stated that 85% of the organization's budget comes from members of the general public in the form of small donations.

Leadership
From founding the organization to their dismissal in 2018, Martela and Chaubal served as Trans Lifeline's Executive Director and Director of Operations, respectively. They were replaced by Sam Ames as interim Executive Director and Tiffany St. Bunny as Director of Operations. Then-Deputy Executive Director Reverend Elena Rose Vera succeeded Ames in March 2019 before stepping down herself in September 2021.

Fundraisers and Partnerships
In 2019, the organization was the recipient of funds raised by Vice Magazine'''s Save Point 2019 campaign, a 72-hour marathon gaming stream on the Twitch platform.
Trans artist Ramona Sharples has raised $3,000+ for Trans Lifeline via the sale of her enamel pins and buttons which depict trans people as well as trans pride statements.
In June 2020, Trans Lifeline partnered with MTV, LOGO, and Kim Petras in order to provide an extra 20 microgrants for youth in need to correct their legal documents. 75% of applicants selected for these grants will be BIPOC.
In response to the introduction of Texas Bill SB1646, members of the Dallas Steaks (a subsection of fans of the online video game Blaseball) held a charity live stream in which they raised over $10,000 to benefit Trans Lifeline.

In media
On July 22, 2019, Trans Lifeline Executive Director Elena Rose Vera was interviewed in Paper Magazine.
On June 30, 2019, Trans Lifeline Executive Director Elena Rose Vera was interviewed on the podcast Queery.
On April 21, 2019, Trans Lifeline Executive Director Elena Rose Vera was interviewed on Waypoint Radio, a Vice Magazine podcast.
On October 24, 2018, then-Trans Lifeline Executive Director Sam Ames was interviewed in Teen Vogue''.

References

External links
 Official site

LGBT political advocacy groups in the United States
Legal advocacy organizations in the United States
Transgender organizations in the United States
Non-profit organizations based in California
Crisis hotlines
Suicide prevention
Organizations established in 2014
2014 establishments in California
LGBT and suicide